Housefull Action was an Indian cable and satellite 24-hour Hindi Bhojpuri movie television channel that was owned by Swami Films Entertainment Pvt Ltd. The channel was launched on 1 September 2015. Earlier it airs 9X Bajao as well in a smaller logo, so it can be considered a 9X branded movie channel.

See also
Cinema TV

References

2016 establishments in Delhi
Television channels and stations established in 2016
Television stations in New Delhi